It's Raining is the third Korean-language studio album by South Korean pop and R&B singer Rain, released on October 8, 2004. The sales as well as success of the album established him as one of the top musical acts in Southeast Asia. It is also the first album that Bi (비) uses the English name "Rain" internationally ("Bi (비)" is the Korean word for Rain). A Japanese edition of the album was released on February 16, 2005.

Singles 
"It's Raining" is the album's title track and was released as the lead single. It explores a more upbeat, hip-hop influenced sound in contrast to his previous releases. It won the Most Popular Music Video daesang award at the 2004 Mnet Km Music Video Festival and the Grand Prize at the annual KBS Music Awards.

"I Do" was released as a follow-up single to the title track. After the success of "It's Raining", "I Do" exhibited a calmer, up-tempo ballad style. The lyrics talk about how he pledges to be the very best for his lover. Its music video shows Rain running from his messy room (where he films a video of himself singing for his girlfriend) to the streets, passing by many couples. Eventually, he reaches the restaurant where his girlfriend is waiting for him, and plucks flowers out of a nearby flower box for her bouquet before greeting her.

Reception 
The first single "It's Raining" along with the album of the same name went no. #1 throughout Southeast Asia, cementing Rain's position as one of the region's top musical acts. A more upbeat, hip-hop influence was displayed on the single "It's Raining" as well as throughout the album.

From 2004 to 2006, the album sold over 200,000 copies in South Korea. For the Japanese release, the album was released with a different cover as well as the making of "It's Raining" music video.

Accolades

Rainy Day Tour 

To promote the release, Rain held his first concert tour, the Rainy Day 2005 Tour, that spanned Seoul, the US, Japan, China, Singapore, and more, for a total of 19 concerts in several countries in Asia and North America. His first show in Japan held at the Tokyo International Forum sold out in 30 seconds. His New York show at The Theater at Madison Square Garden was the largest concert by an K-pop artist in New York City at the time, and featured appearances from Park Ji-yoon, as well as JoJo, P. Diddy and Omarion.

Shows

Track listing

Charts

Weekly charts

Monthly charts

Year-end charts

Sales

Release history

References

Rain (entertainer) albums
JYP Entertainment albums
2004 albums
Korean-language albums